All Mornin' Long is a jazz album by pianist Red Garland, released in April 1958 on the Prestige label. It features only three pieces, which belong to the hard bop subgenre and distinguish themselves by being fast-paced and bluesy. Critic Ira Gitler found the album satisfactory and said that the title piece was a "many-splendored, deep-dish demonstration of feeling, mood and melody".

Track listing 
 "All Mornin' Long" (Red Garland) – 20:21
 "They Can't Take That Away from Me" (George Gershwin, Ira Gershwin) – 10:28
 "Our Delight" (Tadd Dameron) – 6:18

Personnel 
 Red Garland – piano
 John Coltrane – tenor sax
 Donald Byrd – trumpet
 George Joyner – bass
 Art Taylor – drums

References 

1958 albums
Prestige Records albums
Albums produced by Bob Weinstock
Red Garland albums
Albums recorded at Van Gelder Studio
Hard bop albums